Antonivka can refer to any of several places in Ukraine:
Antonivka, Kherson Raion, Kherson Oblast
Antonivka, Babanka Raion
Antonivka, Bar Raion
Antonivka, Berezivka Raion
Antonivka, Berezne Raion
Antonivka, Bratske Raion
Antonivka, Chemerivtsi Raion
Antonivka, Dolynska Raion
Antonivka, Domanivka Raion
Antonivka, Dunaiivtsi Raion
Antonivka, Dzhankoi Raion
Antonivka, Hmelnytskyi Raion
Antonivka, Hornostaiivka Raion
Antonivka, Horohiv Raion
Antonivka, Iampil Raion
Antonivka, Iemilchiyne Raion
Antonivka, Izyaslav Raion
Antonivka, Kaharlyk Raion
Antonivka, Kherson Raion
Antonivka, Kompaniivka Raion
Antonivka, Korostyshiv Raion
Antonivka, Krasnooknyansk Raion
Antonivka, Krolevets Raion
Antonivka, Letychiv Raion
Antonivka, Lityn Raion
Antonivka, Liubashivka Raion
Antonivka, Lutsk Raion
Antonivka, Nova Odesa Raion
Antonivka, Nova Ushytsya Raion
Antonivka, Novyi Buh Raion
Antonivka, Oleksandrivka Raion
Antonivka, Razdelna Raion
Antonivka, Rozivka Raion
Antonivka, Shpola Raion
Antonivka, Solone Raion
Antonivka, Starobilsk Raion
Antonivka, Stavyshche Raion
Antonivka, Talne Raion
Antonivka, Tarashchya Raion
Antonivka, Teofipol Raion
Antonivka, Teplyk Raion
Antonivka, Tlumachi Raion
Antonivka, Tomashpil Raion
Antonivka, Varva Raion
Antonivka, Vilnyansk Raion
Antonivka, Volodymyrets Raion
Antonivka, Zhydachiv Raion
Mala Antonivka, Bila Tserkva Raion

See also
Antonovca (disambiguation)